Birkir Kristinsson (born 15 August 1964) is an Icelandic former footballer who played as a goalkeeper.

Club career
He started his career with local Vestmannaeyjar team ÍBV, and also played with Einherji from Vopnafjordur, KA from Akureyri, ÍA and Fram in the Icelandic league before moving to Norway with SK Brann in 1996, where he is still considered as a hero, after his efforts in the cup winner's cup in 1997, where SK Brann reached the quarter finals. He moved to English club Birmingham City and after failing to make an impression there, he moved on to spells with Swedish side IFK Norrköping, Bolton Wanderers and Austrian club Lustenau before making a return to ÍBV. In December 2000 he moved to Stoke City where his brother Magnús Kristinsson was a member of the Icelandic board at Stoke. He made a decent enough start at Stoke taking over from Gavin Ward until he made a mistake against Northampton Town in February 2001. He did retain his place in the side but after conceding three goals against lowly Cambridge United Ward was reinstated. He didn't make an appearance in 2001–02 and returned to Iceland playing for ÍBV.

International career
He earned 72 caps for the Iceland national football team, over a period of sixteen years. His last international match was against Italy in Reykjavík 15 August 2004, where Iceland beat Italy 2–0. Birkir Kristinsson turned 40 that day.

Career statistics

Club
Sources:

A.  The "Other" column constitutes appearances and goals in the Football League Trophy.

International
Source:

References

External links
 
 

1964 births
Living people
Birkir Kristinsson
Birkir Kristinsson
Birkir Kristinsson
Birkir Kristinsson
Birkir Kristinsson
Birkir Kristinsson
SK Brann players
IFK Norrköping players
Bolton Wanderers F.C. players
Birkir Kristinsson
SC Austria Lustenau players
Stoke City F.C. players
Eliteserien players
Expatriate footballers in Norway
Birkir Kristinsson
Expatriate footballers in Sweden
Birkir Kristinsson
Expatriate footballers in England
Birkir Kristinsson
Expatriate footballers in Austria
Birkir Kristinsson
Birkir Kristinsson
Birkir Kristinsson
Allsvenskan players
English Football League players
Austrian Football Bundesliga players
Association football goalkeepers
Birkir Kristinsson